Sir Edmund Bedingfield or Bedingfeld (1479/80 – 1553).

Edmund Bedingfield was the third son of Sir Edmund Bedingfield, Knight of the Bath (who had licence to build Oxburgh Hall, Norfolk in 1482), and his second wife Dame Margaret, daughter of Sir John Scott (Marshal of Calais), of Scot's Hall in Kent. Sir Edmund the father died in 1496-97, making his will at Calais. His widow died in 1514, having made her will the previous year, in which she established the Bedingfield chapel in St John's parish church at Oxborough.

Edmund Bedingfield married Grace Marney, daughter of Henry Marney, 1st Baron Marney, before 1509. She died in or after 1553. His eldest brother was Sir Thomas Bedingfield, who died without male issue. The second brother, Robert, was in holy orders, and therefore the estates passed him by, and descended to Edmund as heir. Bedingfield's sister Mary was the first wife of Sir Edward Echyngham.

In 1523 Bedingfield was knighted for bravery by Charles Brandon, 1st Duke of Suffolk on the occasion of the taking of the French town of Montdidier.

Following the proceedings of 18 June 1529 concerning King Henry VIII's Great Matter (his divorce),  Sir Edmund Bedingfield was entrusted with the custody of Katherine of Aragon at Kimbolton Castle.

In 1539 he inherited from his brother Robert the great estate of Oxburgh Hall, King's Lynn, Norfolk.

His first son Sir Henry Bedingfield (by 1509-1583) succeeded to his estate in June 1553.

References

15th-century births
1553 deaths
Knights of the Bath
16th-century English people
Year of birth missing